Victorino Eugénio da Silva e Cunha, (born April 18, 1945 in Mogofores, Portugal) is a former basketball player and basketball coach. While being born in Portugal, he moved to Angola at the age of 3. Cunha, who coached the Angola National team to win three African titles, in 1989, 1992 and 1993, in addition to coaching the same team at the world championships in 1986, 1990 and 1994 and the 1992 Summer Olympics, is widely regarded as the forefather of Angolan basketball and the mastermind behind all the success achieved by the sports in Angola.

While losing 48-116 to the US Dream Team in the 1992 Summer Olympics may be considered normal due to the huge differences in both teams, Cunha is also remembered to have led Angola to an historical 20-point lead win over Spain, in the same tournament.

Cunha has served as a FIBA Africa instructor. As of 2009, an annual basketball tournament in Angola named Victorino Cunha Cup, has been established in his honour.

See also
 Wlademiro Romero
 Victorino Cunha Cup

References

Angolan basketball coaches
1945 births
Living people
Portuguese emigrants to Angola
Angolan people of Portuguese descent
Atlético Petróleos de Luanda (basketball) coaches